Jacques-Nompar de Caumont, duc de La Force (30 December 1558 – 10 May 1652) was a Marshal of France and Peer of France. He was the son of a Huguenot, Francois de Caumont, lord of Castelnau, and Philippe de Beaupoil. He survived the St. Bartholomew's Day Massacre in 1572, but his father and older brother Armand were killed.

Marriages and issue
 He married, on 5 February 1577, Charlotte de Gontaut, (1561–June 1635), daughter of marshal Armand de Gontaut, baron de Biron, and by her had ten children:
 Armand-Nompar de Caumont, duc de La Force (c.1580–1675), peer and marshal of France. His daughter
Charlotte married Henri de la Tour d'Auvergne, Vicomte de Turenne, but died in 1666 without children.
 Henri-Nompar de Caumont, duc de La Force (1582–1678), his daughter
 Charlotte married in 1630 de Gabriel de Caumont, comte de Lauzun, and were parents of
 Antoine Nompar de Caumont, Duc de Lauzun
 Jacques, seigneur de Maduran, killed during the siege of Jülich in 1610
 Charles, seigneur de Maduran.
 Pierre, baron d'Aymet.
 Jean, seigneur de Montpouillan.
 Jean-Jacob, marquis de Tonneins
 François de Caumont La Force, whose daughter was:
 Charlotte-Rose de Caumont La Force or Mademoiselle de La Force (1654–1724)
 Jacqueline
 Isabelle
 He married, after 1635, Anne de Mornay, widow of Jacques Moues and daughter of Philippe de Mornay
 He married, after 1635, Isabelle de Clermont-Gallerande, widow of Gideon van den Boetzelaer (1569–1634), Ambassador of the States of Holland in France.

Career

As marquis de La Force, he served Henri IV, whose confidence he enjoyed. He was governor of Béarn from 1593 to 1621 and then viceroy of Navarre. After the assassination of Henry IV in 1610, he fought with the Huguenots against Louis XIII. He plotted with Henri de Rohan and participated in the successful defence of Montauban in 1621, after an 86-day siege by the king, although he  was reconciled with Louis XIII the following year. La Force was made a marshal of France on 27 May 1622, to be employed as the Lieutenant-General of the Army of Piedmont. He campaigned in Piedmont in 1630, taking Pinerolo as well as Saluzzo and defeated the Spaniards at Carignano.

In 1631, he served in the Languedoc and between 1631 and 1634 he invaded Lorraine, and took La Mothe after a siege of 141 days in which Turenne first distinguished himself and La Force's grandson Jacques was killed. In Germany, in 1634, he also raised the siege of Philippsburg in Baden and captured the general Colloredo. In the following year, he relieved Heidelberg and took Speyer.

He was created Duc de La Force and a peer on 3 August 1637.

In 1638 he besieged Saint-Omer in Flanders, but was defeated by Louis Thomas of Savoy-Carignan. It was his last battle.

La Force died in Bergerac on 10 May 1652 and was buried in Milandes. He was succeeded by his eldest son, Armand-Nompar.  His memoirs were published in 1843.

See also

 Peter Force
 William Force Stead

Footnotes

Sources

External links
 Jacques Nompar de Caumont Family tree
 Seigneurs de Caumont-La Force Lineage of the lords of Caumont and Dukes of La Force
 Histoire de Caumont Caumont history
 The Caumonts
 Château de Castelnaud

1558 births
1652 deaths
Dukes of La Force
Peers created by Louis XIII
Marquesses of La Force
Marshals of France
Military personnel of the Franco-Spanish War (1635–1659)